"Call Me Sir" is a song by American rock band Train featuring American country music singer Cam and American rapper Travie McCoy, the lead vocalist of Gym Class Heroes. It was released on May 24, 2018, the single Included from first compilation album Greatest Hits.

Background 
Call Me Sir is a song about the social advantages that come with dating someone. Pat Monahan, the lead singer of Train, confirmed on Facebook that the song's lyrics tell a true story.

Music video
Train released the video for single "Call Me Sir" on August 21, 2018. The video follows a young boy who feels like an outsider until he meets a girl who helps him find his confidence, frontman Patrick Monahan say: "The 'Call Me Sir' video was a blast to make. It’s about a little girl helping a little boy feel like maybe he’ll be ok in this life,".

And he stated "Being around Cam and Travie is always great and the kids that played the younger versions of us were super cute and great at their parts," he continues. "Might have been the easiest, funniest video shoot in the past 20 years".

Charts

Weekly charts

Year-end charts

References

2018 songs
2018 singles
Columbia Records singles
Songs written by William Wiik Larsen
Songs written by Travie McCoy
Songs written by Pat Monahan